Mahabub Hossain Roksy (born 10 October 1975) is a Bangladeshi football coach and former national team player.

Coaching career
Roksy is now the head coach of Sheikh Jamal Dhanmondi Club in Bangladesh Football Premier League. He is now also assisting head coach Andrew Ord of Bangladesh national football team.
He was the head coach of Bangladesh side during 2017 SAFF U-18 Championship.

Statistics
As Head Coach

References

Living people
People from Chittagong
Brothers Union players
Mohammedan SC (Dhaka) players
Arambagh KS players
Mohammedan SC (Kolkata) players
Bangladeshi football managers
Bangladeshi expatriate sportspeople in India
Bangladeshi expatriate footballers
Bangladeshi football coaches
Bangladesh international footballers
Bangladeshi footballers
Association football midfielders
1975 births